Passion Session is the seventh album by Canadian guitarist Don Ross and his first on the Narada/Virgin label. It was recorded in Berlin, Germany in the confines of the Passionskirche (The Church of the Passion) in Berlin's Kreuzberg neighborhood.

Track listing
All songs by Don Ross except as noted.

 "Klimbim" – 4:54
 "Michael, Michael, Michael" – 4:12
 "Berkeley Springs" (David Essig) – 3:30
 "Tight Trite Night" – 4:00
 "First Ride" – 4:06
 "With You in Mind" – 4:51
 "Annie and Martin" – 4:55
 "So Little Time" – 4:14
 "Give Me Seven Reasons" – 4:09
 "Blue Bear" – 2:23
 "No Goodbyes" – 3:57

Personnel
Don Ross – guitar

Production notes
Engineered by Knut Becker

Don Ross (guitarist) albums
1999 albums